Brief Ecstasy is a 1937 British drama film directed by Edmond T. Gréville and starring Paul Lukas, Hugh Williams, Linden Travers and Marie Ney. It was made at Ealing Studios.

Plot

Cast
 Paul Lukas - Professor Paul Bernardy
 Hugh Williams - Jim Wyndham
 Linden Travers - Helen Norwood Bernardy
 Marie Ney - Martha Russell
 Renee Gadd - Marjorie
 Fred Withers - Gardener
 Howard Douglas - Coleman
 Fewlass Llewellyn - Director of Steel Company
 Peter Gawthorne - Chairman of Steel Company
 Norman Pierce - Landlord

Reception
Writing for Night and Day in 1937, Graham Greene gave the film a good review, expressing admiration for producer Perceval's ability to "wring twenty shillings' worth out of every pound" and director Gréville's recognition that for a film whose subject is sexual passion "the story doesn't matter; it's the atmosphere which counts". Greene praised Gréville's "wanton and vivid" depictions of "undifferentiated desire" as well as his French education in "photograph[ing] a woman's body - uncompromisingly", and noted that "the film at its finest [...] generalizes", and "there isn't, thank God, any love in it".

References

External links
 

1937 films
Ealing Studios films
British drama films
1937 drama films
Films set in London
Films set in England
Films set in India
Films directed by Edmond T. Gréville
British black-and-white films
Films scored by Walter Goehr
1930s English-language films
1930s British films